This article lists the winners and nominees for the Black Reel Award for Television for Outstanding Guest Actress, Drama Series. 
The category was first introduced as Outstanding Guest Performer, Drama Series, honoring both actors and actresses in guest starring roles on television. In 2018, the category was split into categories for each gender, resulting in the name change to its current title.

Winners and nominees
Winners are listed first and highlighted in bold.

2010s

2020s

Superlatives

Programs with multiple awards

2 awards
 This Is Us

Performers with multiple awards

3 awards
 Phylicia Rashad (2 consecutively)

Programs with multiple nominations

4 nominations
 How to Get Away With Murder

3 nominations 
 Black Lightning
 This Is Us

2 nominations
 Empire
 Queen Sugar

Performers with multiple nominations

5 nominations 
 Phylicia Rashad

4 nominations
 Cicely Tyson

2 nominations
 Jill Scott

Total awards by network
 NBC - 2
 ABC - 1 
 FOX - 1

References

Black Reel Awards